The fifteenth series of British talent competition programme Britain's Got Talent started on ITV from 16 April 2022 presented by Ant & Dec. The judges are the same as the previous series with Simon Cowell returning after missing the previous series live shows due to an electric bike accident where he was replaced by Ashley Banjo. This was the last series to feature David Walliams as a judge. 

The fifteenth series was won by stand-up comedian Axel Blake, with ventriloquist Jamie Leahey finishing in second place.

Series overview 
The fifteenth series was planned for production and broadcast in 2021, yet ITV, Thames and Syco Entertainment were concerned on how to safely conduct filming in the midst of new Government restrictions to combat the COVID-19 pandemic in England. After initially deciding to postpone production until later in the year, all involved parties agreed that they would not produce a new series until the following year, when Government restrictions would be eased and conditions surrounding the pandemic would be favourable for large-scale television production. Auditions were filmed at the London Palladium in January 2022. The series commenced on ITV, on 16 April 2022. All four judges returned - Simon Cowell, Amanda Holden, Alesha Dixon and David Walliams for their fifteenth, fifteenth, tenth and tenth series, respectively. This was Walliams' final series as a judge. Cowell returned after missing the live shows during the previous series due to a bicycle accident where he was replaced by Ashley Banjo who won the third series with Diversity.

 |  | 
 Judges' Wildcard Finalist |  Golden Buzzer Audition

Semi-finals summary
 Buzzed out |  Judges' vote |  |  
 |

Semi-final 1 (30 May)
Guest performers: Moulin Rouge! The Musical ("Welcome to the Moulin Rouge"/"Backstage Romance")

Semi-final 2 (31 May)
Guest Performers: Back to the Future: The Musical (with Roger Bart) ("The Power of Love"/"It Works")

  Amber & Her Dancing Collies were later sent through to the final as the judges' wildcard.
  Walliams buzzed after Ranger Chris' performance.

Semi-final 3 (1 June)
Guest performers: Diversity

Due to the majority vote for Eva Abley, Cowell's voting intention was not revealed.

Semi-final 4 (2 June)
Guest performers: Emeli Sandé and Kseniya Simonova ("Brighter Days")

Cowell requested his X was removed after the act during his comments.
Cowell did not cast his vote due to the majority support for 5 Star Boys from the other judges, but admitted his voting intention would have been for this semi-finalist.
 The Phantom pressed Walliams’ buzzer as part of the act.

Semi-final 5 (3 June) 
Guest performers: Jon Courtenay, Colin Thackery, D-Day Darlings and D-Day Juniors

Due to the majority vote for Aneeshwar Kunchala, Cowell's voting intention was not revealed.

Final (5 June)
Guest performers: Sister Act The Musical ("Raise Your Voice")
 |

Ratings

References 

2022 British television seasons
Britain's Got Talent